The 1986 Chernobyl disaster triggered the release of radioactive contamination into the atmosphere in the form of both particulate and gaseous radioisotopes. , it was the world's largest known release of radioactivity into the environment.

The work of the Scientific Committee on Problems of the Environment (SCOPE), suggests that the Chernobyl incident cannot be directly compared to atmospheric tests of nuclear weapons by simply saying that it's better or worse. This is partly because the isotopes released at Chernobyl tended to be longer-lived than those released by the detonation of atomic bombs.

The economic damage caused by the disaster is estimated at $225 billion.

Radiation effects on humans

According to a 2009 United Nations Scientific Committee on the Effects of Atomic Radiation (UNSCEAR) study, the Chernobyl accident had by 2005 caused 61,200 man-Sv of radiation exposure to recovery workers and evacuees, 125,000 man-Sv to the populace of Ukraine, Belarus, and Russia, and a dose to most other European countries amounting to 115,000 man-Sv. The report estimated a further 25% more exposure would be received from residual radioisotopes after 2005. The global collective dose from Chernobyl was earlier estimated by UNSCEAR in 1988 to be "600,000 man Sv, equivalent on average to 21 additional days of world exposure to natural background radiation."

Dose to the general public within 30 km of the plant
The inhalation dose (internal dose) for the public during the time of the accident and their evacuation from the area in what is now the 30 km evacuation zone around the plant has been estimated (based on ground deposition of caesium-137) to be between 3 and 150 mSv.

Thyroid doses for adults around the Chernobyl area were estimated to be between 20 and 1000 mSv, while for one-year-old infants, these estimates were higher, at 20 to 6000 mSv. For those who left the area soon after the accident, the internal dose due to inhalation was 8 to 13 times higher than the external dose due to gamma/beta emitters. For those who remained until later (day 10 or later), the inhalation dose was 50 to 70% higher than the dose due to external exposure. The majority of the dose was due to iodine-131 (about 40%) and tellurium and rubidium isotopes (about 20 to 30% for Rb and Te).

The ingestion doses in this same group of people have also been estimated using the cesium activity per unit of area, isotope ratios, an average day of evacuation, intake rate of milk and green vegetables, and what is known about the transfer of radioactivity via plants and animals to humans. For adults, the dose has been estimated to be between 3 and 180 mSv, while for one-year-old infants, a dose of between 20 and 1300 mSv has been estimated. Again, the majority of the dose was thought to be due to iodine-131.

Childhood exposure 
Ukraine, Belarus and parts of Russia were exposed to radiation after the Chernobyl disaster in 1986, but prior to the disaster the number of children affected by thyroid cancer was relatively low globally. Every year about, "0.1–2.2 individuals per million of all aged under 15 years old world wide" were affected by thyroid cancer. Research has shown after the Chernobyl disaster the level of thyroid cancer, particularly in children near the radiation exposure, increased. Although iodine-131 has a short half-life compared to other radioactive isotopes, iodine-131 made its way through the food chain through a milk-to-consumer pathway. 95% of iodine-131 was ingested through milk after the disaster. Communities were unaware of the contamination deposited in soil and the transforming capabilities of radiation into other food sources. Children also absorbed radiation after drinking milk.

The absorption rate discovered in children has also shown to be inversely proportional to age. 
There is a high rate of thyroid cancer among children less than 15 years old who were exposed to the radiation after the disaster and an increasing level of dosage as age decreases. This inverse proportion could be explained by the way in which children absorb iodine-131. Children have smaller thyroid glands compared to adults and have a different dosage response after the ingestion of iodine-131. A cohort study conducted in 2013 discovered a similar trend between age and dosage response. The cohort was composed of 12,000 participants, all of which were exposed to the radiation in Belarus and reported to be under the age of 18 at the time of the exposure.

Future study 
Studying the populations that were exposed to radiation after the Chernobyl accident has provided data linking exposure to radiation and the future development of cancer.

Cases of pediatric thyroid cancer, likely caused by absorption of Iodine-131 into the thyroid gland, increased in Ukraine and Belarus 3 to 4 years after the accident. Children were most at risk, and cases did not seem to increase in adults. The greatest increase was seen in children who were the youngest at the time of exposure, and most of the pediatric thyroid cases were reported in Gomel, Belarus, where the population was exposed to the highest levels of contamination. The majority of the cases that appeared in the exposed population were papillary thyroid cancer.

Before the accident, the rate of thyroid cancer in children in Belarus was less than 1 per million. By 1995, nine years after the disaster, the number of cases of pediatric thyroid cancer in Gomel Oblast rose to 100 per million per year. Even as adults those who were exposed to the radiation as children may still be at risk of developing thyroid cancer decades after the exposure. It is important to study the at risk population throughout their lives, and observe if different patterns arise in tumors that develop with longer latency.

A group of experts who are part of the Agenda for Research on Chernobyl Health (ARCH) have proposed a series of potential studies that would examine the continued effects from the Chernobyl accident, and provide more information on the full extent of related health consequences. Results from lifelong observation of the exposed population could provide more information on risks as well as future protection against radiation exposure.

Short-term health effects and immediate results
The explosion at the power station and subsequent fires inside the remains of the reactor resulted in the development and dispersal of a radioactive cloud which drifted not only over Russia, Belarus, and Ukraine, but also over most of Europe and as far as Canada. 
The initial evidence that a release of radioactive material had occurred came not from Soviet sources, but from Sweden, where on 28 April (two days after the disaster itself) workers at the Forsmark Nuclear Power Plant (approximately 1100 km from the Chernobyl site) were found to have radioactive particles on their clothing.

It was Sweden's search for the source of the radioactivity (after they had determined there was no leak at the Swedish plant) that led to the first hint of a critical incident in the Western Soviet Union.

Contamination from the Chernobyl disaster was not evenly spread across the surrounding countryside but scattered irregularly depending on weather conditions. Reports from Soviet and Western scientists indicate that Belarus received about 60% of the contamination that fell on the former Soviet Union. A large area in Russia south of Bryansk was also contaminated, as were parts of northwestern Ukraine.

203 people were hospitalized, of whom 31 died (28 of them died from acute radiation exposure). Most of these were fire and rescue workers trying to bring the disaster under control, who were not aware of how dangerous the radiation exposure (from the smoke) was (for a discussion of the more important isotopes in fallout see fission products). 135,000 people were evacuated from the area, including 50,000 from the nearby town of Pripyat, Ukraine. Health officials have predicted that over the next 70 years there will be a 28% increase in cancer rates in much of the population which was exposed to the 5–12 EBq (depending on source) of radioactive contamination released from the reactor.

Soviet scientists reported that the Chernobyl Unit 4 reactor contained about 180–190 metric tons of uranium dioxide fuel and fission products. Estimates of the amount of this material that escaped range from 5 to 30%. Because of the heat of the fire, and with no containment building to stop it, part of the ejected fuel was vaporized or particularized and rose into the atmosphere, where it spread.

Workers and "liquidators"

The workers involved in the recovery and clean up after the disaster, called "liquidators", received high doses of radiation. In most cases, these workers were not equipped with individual dosimeters to measure the amount of radiation received, so experts could only estimate their doses. Even where dosimeters were used, dosimetric procedures varied - some workers are thought to have been given more accurate estimated doses than others. According to Soviet estimates, between 300,000 and 600,000 people were involved in the cleanup of the 30 km evacuation zone around the reactor, but many of them entered the zone two years after the disaster.

Estimates of the number of "liquidators" vary; the World Health Organization, for example, puts the figure at about 600,000; Russia lists as liquidators some people who did not work in contaminated areas. In the first year after the disaster, the number of cleanup workers in the zone was estimated to be 2,000. These workers received an estimated average dose of 165 millisieverts (16.5 REM).

A sevenfold increase in DNA mutations has been identified in children of liquidators conceived after the accident, when compared to their siblings that were conceived before. However, this effect has diminished over time.

Evacuation
Soviet Military authorities started evacuating people from the area around Chernobyl on the second day after the disaster (after about 36 hours). By May 1986, about a month later, all those living within a  radius of the plant (about 116,000 people) had been relocated. This area is often referred to as the zone of alienation. However, radiation affected the environment over a much wider scale than this 30 km radius encloses.

According to reports from Soviet scientists, 28,000 square kilometers (km2, or 10,800 square miles, mi2) were contaminated by caesium-137 to levels greater than 185 kBq per square meter. 830,000 people lived in this area. About 10,500 km 2 (4,000 mi2) were contaminated by caesium-137 to levels greater than 555 kBq/m2. Of this total, roughly 7,000 km2 (2,700 mi2) lie in Belarus, 2,000 km2 (800 mi2) in the Russian Federation and 1,500 km2 (580 mi2) in Ukraine. About 250,000 people lived in this area. These reported data were corroborated by the International Chernobyl Project.

Civilians
Some children in the contaminated areas were exposed to high thyroid doses of up to 50 gray (Gy), mostly due to an intake of radioactive iodine-131 (a relatively short-lived isotope with a half-life of 8 days) from contaminated milk produced locally. Several studies  have found that the incidence of thyroid cancer among children in Belarus, Ukraine, and Russia has risen since the Chernobyl disaster. The International Atomic Energy Agency (IAEA) notes "1800 documented cases of thyroid cancer in children who were between 0 and 14 years of age when the disaster occurred, which is far higher than normal", although this source fails to note the expected rate. The childhood thyroid cancers that have appeared are of an aggressive type but, if detected early, can be treated. Treatment entails surgery followed by iodine-131 therapy for any metastases. To date, such treatment appears to have been successful in the vast majority of cases.

Late in 1995, the World Health Organization (WHO) linked nearly 700 cases of thyroid cancer among children and adolescents to the Chernobyl disaster, and among these, some 10 deaths are attributed to radiation. However, the rapid increase in thyroid cancers detected suggests some of this increase may be an artifact of the screening process. Typical latency time of radiation-induced thyroid cancer is about 10 years, but the increase in childhood thyroid cancers in some regions was observed as early as 1987.

Plant and animal health

A swath of pine forest killed by acute radiation was named the Red Forest. The dead pines were bulldozed and buried. Livestock were removed during the human evacuations. Elsewhere in Europe, levels of radioactivity were examined in various natural food stocks. In both Sweden and Finland, fish in deep freshwater lakes were banned for resale and landowners were advised not to consume certain types.

Animals living in contaminated areas in and around Chernobyl developed side effects caused by the initial levels of radiation. When the disaster first occurred, the health and reproductive ability of animals and plants were negatively affected for the first six months.

Invertebrate populations (including bumblebees, butterflies, grasshoppers, dragonflies, and spiders) decreased. As of 2009, most radioactivity around Chernobyl was located in the top layer of soil, where many invertebrates live or lay their eggs.

Radionuclides migrate through either soil diffusion or transportation within the soil solution. The effects of ionizing radiation on plants and trees in particular depends on factors that include climatic conditions, the mechanism of radiation deposition, and the soil type. Altitude, soil disturbance, and biological activity are also factors that influence the amount of radioisotopes in soil. Radiated vegetation affects organisms further up the food chain. Upper-level trophic organisms may have received less contamination, due to their ability to be more mobile and feed from multiple areas.

The amount of radioactive nuclides found to have been deposited into surrounding lakes has increased the normal baseline radioactive amounts by 100 percent. Most of the radionuclides in surrounding water areas were found in the sediments at the bottom of the lakes. There has been a high incidence of chromosomal changes in plant and animal aquatic organisms, and this generally has correlated with the contamination and resulting genetic instability. Most of the lakes and rivers surrounding the Chernobyl exclusion zone are still contaminated with radionuclides (and will be for many years to come) as the natural decontamination processes of nuclides with longer half-lives can take years.

One of the mechanisms by which radionuclides were passed to humans was through the ingestion of milk from contaminated cows. Most of the rough grazing that the cows took part in contained plant species such as coarse grasses, sedges, rushes, and plants such as heather (also known as Calluna vulgaris). These plant species grow in soils that are high in organic matter, low in pH, and are often well hydrated, thus making the storage and intake of these radionuclides more feasible and efficient. Shortly after the Chernobyl accident, high levels of radionuclides were found in the milk and were a direct result of contaminated feeding. Within two months of banning most of the milk that was being produced in the affected areas, officials had phased out the majority of the contaminated feed that was available to the cows and much of the contamination was isolated. In humans, ingestion of milk containing abnormally high levels of iodine radionuclides was the precursor for thyroid disease, especially in children and in the immunocompromised.

Due to the bioaccumulation of caesium-137, some mushrooms as well as wild animals which eat them, e.g. wild boars hunted in Germany and deer in Austria, may have levels which are not considered safe for human consumption. Mandatory radioactivity testing of sheep in parts of the UK that graze on lands with contaminated peat was lifted in 2012.

While effects on the immediate physical health of individual animals within the affected area tended to be negative, population levels of animals in the affected areas began to increase following the evacuation of humans. 
In the 1996 BBC Horizon documentary 'Inside Chernobyl's Sarcophagus', birds are seen flying in and out of large holes in the structure itself. Other casual observations also reported an increase in biodiversity due to the reduced human presence.

Human pregnancy
Despite spurious studies from Germany and Turkey, the only robust evidence of negative pregnancy outcomes that transpired after the accident was the increase in elective abortions, these "indirect effects", in Greece, Denmark, Italy etc., have been attributed to "anxieties created" by the media.

Researchers at the time knew that high doses of radiation increase the rate of physiological pregnancy and fetal abnormalities, but select researchers who were familiar with both the prior human exposure data and animal testing knew that, unlike the dominant linear no-threshold model of radiation and cancer rate increases, the "Malformation of organs appears to be a deterministic effect (an effect not caused by chance) with a threshold dose" below which no rate increase is observed. Frank Castronovo of the Harvard Medical School discussed this teratology (birth defects) issue in 1999, publishing a review of dose reconstructions and the available pregnancy data following the Chernobyl accident, which included data from Kiyv's two largest obstetrics hospitals. Castronovo concludes that "the lay press with newspaper reporters playing up anecdotal stories of children with birth defects" and dubious studies flawed by "selection bias", are the two primary factors causing the persistent belief that Chernobyl increased the background rate of birth defects. However, the data does not support this perception because, since no pregnant individuals took part in the most radioactive liquidator operations, no pregnant individuals were exposed to the threshold dose.

Despite Castronovo's statements, Karl Sperling, Heidemarie Neitzel and Hagen Scherb reported that the prevalence of Down syndrome (trisomy 21) in West Berlin, Germany, peaked 9 months following the main fallout.[ 11, 12] From 1980 to 1986 the birth prevalence of Down syndrome was quite stable (i.e., 1.35–1.59 per 1,000 live births [27–31 cases]). In 1987, 46 cases were diagnosed (prevalence = 2.11 per 1,000 live births) and most of the increase resulted from a cluster of 12 children born in January 1987. The prevalence of Down Syndrome in 1988 was 1.77, and in 1989, it reached pre-Chernobyl values. The authors noted that the cluster of children would have been conceived when radioactive clouds containing radionucleotides with short half-lives, like iodine, would have been covering the region and also that the isolated geographical position of West Berlin prior to reunification, the free genetic counseling, and complete coverage of the population through one central cytogenetic laboratory supported completeness of case ascertainment; in addition, constant culture preparation and analysis protocols ensure a high quality of data.

Long-term health effects

Science and politics: the problem of epidemiological studies 

The issue of long-term effects of the Chernobyl disaster on civilians is controversial. Over 300,000 people were resettled because of the disaster; millions lived and continue to live in the contaminated area. On the other hand, most of those affected received relatively low doses of radiation; there is little evidence of increased mortality, cancers or birth defects among them; and when such evidence is present, existence of a causal link to radioactive contamination is uncertain.

An increased incidence of thyroid cancer among children in areas of Belarus, Ukraine and Russia affected by the Chernobyl disaster has been established as a result of screening programs and, in the case of Belarus, an established cancer registry. The findings of most epidemiological studies must be considered interim, say experts, as analysis of the health effects of the disaster is an ongoing process. Multilevel modelling indicates that long-term psychological distress among Belarusians affected by the Chernobyl disaster is better predicted by stress-moderating psychosocial factors present in one's daily life than by level of residential radiation contamination.

Epidemiological studies have been hampered in Ukraine, Russian Federation and Belarus by a lack of funds, an infrastructure with little experience in chronic disease epidemiology, poor communication facilities, public health issues and a political culture of secrecy and deception. Emphasis has been placed on screening rather than on well-designed epidemiological studies. International efforts to organize such studies have been slowed in particular by the lack of a suitable scientific infrastructure.

The political nature of nuclear energy has affected scientific studies. In Belarus, Yury Bandazhevsky, a scientist who questioned the official estimates of Chernobyl's consequences and the relevancy of the official maximum limit of 1,000 Bq/kg, was imprisoned from 2001 to 2005. Bandazhevsky and some human rights groups allege his imprisonment was a reprisal for his publication of reports critical of the official research being conducted into the Chernobyl incident.

The activities undertaken by Belarus and Ukraine in response to the disaster — remediation of the environment, evacuation and resettlement, development of uncontaminated food sources and food distribution channels, and public health measures — have overburdened the governments of those countries. International agencies and foreign governments have provided logistic and humanitarian assistance. In addition, the work of the European Commission and World Health Organization in strengthening the epidemiological research infrastructure in Russia, Ukraine and Belarus is laying the basis for advances in these countries' general ability to conduct epidemiological studies.

Caesium radioisotopes 

The main health concern initially involved radioactive iodine, with a half-life of eight days. Today, there is concern about contamination of the soil with strontium-90 and caesium-137, which have half-lives of about 30 years. The highest levels of caesium-137 are found in the surface layers of the soil where they are absorbed by plants, insects and mushrooms, which then enter the local food supply ). Some scientists fear that radioactivity will affect the local population for the next several generations. Note that caesium is not mobile in most soils because it binds to the clay minerals.

Tests showed that caesium-137 levels in trees were continuing to rise. It is unknown if this is still the case. There is evidence that contamination is migrating into underground aquifers and closed bodies of water such as lakes and ponds (2001, Germenchuk). The main source of elimination is predicted to be natural decay of caesium-137 to stable barium-137, since runoff by rain and groundwater has been demonstrated to be negligible. In 2021, Italian researcher Venturi reported the first correlations between caesium-137, pancreas and pancreatic cancer with the role of non-radioactive caesium in biology and of caesium-137 in chronic pancreatitis and in diabetes of pancreatic origin (Type 3c).

Thyroid cancer 
An increased incidence of thyroid cancer was observed for about 4 years after the accident and slowed in 2005. The increase in incidence of thyroid cancer happened amongst individuals who were adolescents and young children living during the time of the accident, and residing in the most contaminated areas. High levels of radioactive iodine were released in the environment from the Chernobyl reactor after the accident, and accumulated in pastures which were eaten by cows. The milk was later consumed by children who already had an iodine deficient diet, therefore causing more of the radioactive iodine to be accumulated. Radioactive iodine has a short half-life, 8.02 days, if the contaminated milk had been avoided or stopped, it is likely that most of the rise in radiation-induced thyroid cancer wouldn't have happened.

Within the highly contaminated areas – Belarus, the Russian Federation and Ukraine, there were around 5000 cases of thyroid cancer that have been diagnosed since the accident. These cases were found in individuals who were aged 18 and younger during the time of the accident.

Supported by the Russian Federation and Ukraine, The European Commission, the National Cancer Institute of the US, and the Sasakawa Memorial Health Foundation, The Chernobyl Tissue Bank (CTB) was created in 1998, 6 years after published research showed a rise in childhood thyroid cancer. The project is the first international co-operation that collects biological samples from patients exposed to radioiodine during childhood. It started collecting a variety of biological samples from patients on 1 October 1998 and since July 2001 has been a source for ethically available tissue samples - specifically extracted nucleic acids and tissue sections - for 21 research projects in Japan, Europe and the USA. The CTB serves as a model for tissue banking for cancer research in the molecular age.

Contamination in the food supply 
Twenty-five years after the incident, restriction orders had remained in place in the production, transportation and consumption of food contaminated by Chernobyl fallout. In the UK, only in 2012 the mandatory radioactivity testing of sheep in contaminated parts of the UK that graze on lands was lifted. They covered 369 farms on 750 km2 and 200,000 sheep. In parts of Sweden and Finland, restrictions are in place on stock animals, including reindeer, in natural and near-natural environments. "In certain regions of Germany, Austria, Italy, Sweden, Finland, Lithuania and Poland, wild game (including boar and deer), wild mushrooms, berries and carnivorous fish from lakes reach levels of several thousand Bq per kg of caesium-137", while "in Germany, caesium-137 levels in wild boar muscle reached 40,000 Bq/kg. The average level is 6,800 Bq/kg, more than ten times the EU limit of 600 Bq/kg", according to the TORCH 2006 report. The European Commission has stated that "The restrictions on certain foodstuffs from certain Member States must therefore continue to be maintained for years to come".

As of 2009, sheep farmed in some areas of the UK are still subject to inspection which may lead to them being prohibited from entering the human food chain because of contamination arising from the accident:

369 farms and 190,000 sheep are still affected, a reduction of 95% since 1986, when 9,700 farms and 4,225,000 sheep were under restriction across the United Kingdom.
Restrictions were finally lifted in 2012.

In Norway, the Sami people were affected by contaminated food (the reindeer had been contaminated by eating lichen, which accumulates some types of radioactivity emitters).

Data from a long-term monitoring program from 1998 to 2015 (The Korma Report II) shows a significant decrease in internal radiation exposure of the inhabitants of small villages in Belarus 80 km north of Gomel. Resettlement may even be possible in parts of the prohibited areas provided that people comply with appropriate dietary rules.

A 2021 study based on whole-genome sequencing of children of parents employed as liquidators in Chernobyl indicated no trans-generational genetic effects of exposure of parents to ionizing radiation.

Long-term effects on plant and animal health

Over time there have been many reports documenting and discussing the prevalence and health of plants and animals within the Chernobyl Exclusion Zone.
The absence of humans from the Exclusion Zone has made it attractive to wildlife, which now inhabit the area in larger numbers.  This has led some scientists and reporters to describe the area as a natural wildlife sanctuary, and to enthuse about the ability of wildlife in the area to recover.  However, the mere presence of wildlife does not present a complete picture: the ongoing health of individuals and the health of the ecosystems in which they live are also of concern. These issues are difficult to study because many factors interact. Radiologic tolerance and the effects of fallout contamination vary with different species. In addition to ongoing low-dose radiation and quality of local habitat, it has been suggested that fauna in the area may inherit a higher likelihood for genetic damage from ancestors affected by the initial high doses of radiation.

Radiation levels
According to reports from Soviet scientists at the First International Conference on the Biological and Radiological Aspects of the Chernobyl Accident (September 1990), fallout levels in the 10 km zone around the plant were as high as 4.81 GBq/m2. The so-called "Red Forest" (or "Rusted Forest") is the swath of pine trees, located immediately behind the reactor complex within the 10 km zone, which were killed off by heavy radioactive fallout. The forest is so named because in the days following the disaster the trees appeared to have a deep red hue as they died because of extremely heavy radioactive fallout. In the post-disaster cleanup operations, a majority of the 10 km2 forest was bulldozed and buried. The site of the Red Forest remains one of the most contaminated areas in the world.

Population density
In the decades following the evacuation of its human population due to the disaster, the 30 km (19-mile) "exclusion zone" surrounding the Chernobyl disaster has become a de facto wildlife sanctuary.  Animals have reclaimed the land including species such as the Przewalski's horse, Eurasian lynx, wild boar, grey wolf, elk, red deer, moose, brown bear, turtle, voles, mice, shrews, European badger, Eurasian beaver, raccoon dog, red fox, roe deer, European bison, black stork, golden eagle, white-tailed eagle and eagle owl.

A 2015 study found similar numbers of mammals in the zone compared to nearby similar nature reserves.
Long-term empirical data showed no evidence of a negative influence of radiation on mammal abundance.

In 2007, the Ukrainian government designated the Exclusion Zone as a wildlife sanctuary, and at 488.7 km2 it is one of the largest wildlife sanctuaries in Europe.
In 2016, the Ukrainian government designated its part of the area as a radiological and environmental biosphere reserve as part of a six-year project funded by the Global Environment Facility (GEF).

Health impacts
According to a 2005 U.N. report, wildlife has returned despite radiation levels that are presently 10 to 100 times higher than normal background radiation. Radiation levels were significantly higher soon after the accident, but have fallen since then because of radioactive decay.

While there are demonstrably populations of a wide variety of species within the zone, there are still concerns about the  ongoing health of individuals within those populations and their ability to reproduce. 
Møller and Mousseau have published the results of the largest census of animal life in the Chernobyl Exclusion Zone. It said, contrary to the Chernobyl Forum's 2005 report that the biodiversity of insects, birds and mammals in the exclusion zone is declining.

Møller et al. (2005) suggested that the reproductive success and annual survival rates of barn swallows are lower in the Exclusion Zone; 28% of barn swallows inhabiting Chernobyl return each year, while at a control area at Kanev, 250 km to the southeast, the return rate is around 40%.

Barn swallows (Hirundo rustica) sampled between 1991 and 2006 in the Chernobyl exclusion zone are also claimed to display an increased rate of physical abnormalities compared to swallows from uncontaminated areas. Møller et al. (2007) reported an elevated frequency of eleven categories of physical abnormalities including 
such as partially albinistic plumage, deformed toes, tumors, deformed tail feathers, deformed beaks, and deformed  air sacks. Abnormal barn swallows mated with lower frequency, and had a reduced viability in the wild and a decrease in fitness. Effects were attributed to radiation exposure and elevated teratogenic effects of radioactive isotopes in the environment.

Smith et al. (2008) have disputed Møller's findings and instead proposed that a lack of human influence in the Exclusion Zone locally reduced the swallows' insect prey and that radiation levels across the vast majority of the exclusion zone are now too low to have an observable negative effect. The criticisms were responded to in  the same issue by Møller et al. (2008). It is possible that barn swallows are vulnerable to elevated levels of ionizing radiation because they are migratory; they arrive in the exclusion area exhausted and with depleted reserves of radio-protective antioxidants after their journey.

Oxidative stress and low levels of antioxidants can affect the development of the nervous system, including reduced brain size and impaired cognitive abilities. It has been reported that birds living in contaminated areas have smaller brains, which has shown to be a deficit to viability in the wild.

Possible adaptation
It has been suggested that some plants and animals are able to adapt to the increased radiation levels present in and around Chernobyl. 
Further research is needed to assess the long-term health effects of elevated ionizing radiation from Chernobyl on flora and fauna.

Several research groups have suggested that plants in the area have adapted to cope with the high radiation levels, for example by increasing the activity of DNA cellular repair machinery and by hypermethylation. 
Arabidopsis, a plant native to Chernobyl, was able to resist high concentrations of ionizing radiation and resist forming mutations. This species of plant has been able to develop mechanisms to tolerate chronic radiation that would otherwise be harmful or lethal to other species.

Various birds in the area may have adapted to lower levels of radiation by producing more antioxidants, such as glutathione, to help mitigate oxidative stress.

Using robots, researchers have retrieved samples of highly melanized black fungus from the walls of the reactor core itself. It has been shown that certain species of fungus, such as Cryptococcus neoformans and Cladosporium, can actually thrive in a radioactive environment, growing better than non-melanized variants, implying that they use melanin to harness the energy of ionizing radiation from the reactor.

Chernobyl Forum report and criticisms 
In September 2005, a comprehensive report was published by the Chernobyl Forum, composed of agencies that included the International Atomic Energy Agency (IAEA), the World Health Organization (WHO), United Nations bodies and the Governments of Belarus, the Russian Federation and Ukraine. This report titled: "Chernobyl's legacy: Health, Environmental and Socio-Economic Impacts", authored by about 100 recognized experts, put the total predicted number of deaths due to the disaster around 4,000 (of which 2,200 deaths are expected to be in the ranks of 200,000 liquidators). This predicted death toll includes the 47 workers who died of acute radiation syndrome as a direct result of radiation from the disaster, nine children who died from thyroid cancer and an estimated 4000 people who could die from cancer as a result of exposure to radiation. This number was subsequently updated to 9000 excess cancer deaths.

An IAEA press officer admitted that the 4000 figure was given prominence in the report "...to counter the much higher estimates which had previously been seen. ... "It was a bold action to put out a new figure that was much less than conventional wisdom.""

The report stated that, apart from a 30 kilometre area around the site and a few restricted lakes and forests, radiation levels had returned to acceptable levels.

The methodology of the Chernobyl Forum report, supported by Elisabeth Cardis of the International Agency for Research on Cancer, has been disputed by some advocacy organizations opposed to nuclear energy, such as Greenpeace and the International Physicians for Prevention of Nuclear Warfare (IPPNW), as well as some individuals such as Michel Fernex, retired medical doctor from the WHO, and campaigner Dr. Christopher Busby (Green Audit, LLRC). They criticized the restriction of the Forum's study to Belarus, Ukraine and Russia. Furthermore, it only studied the case of 200,000 people involved in the cleanup, and the 400,000 most directly affected by the released radioactivity. German Green Party Member of the European Parliament Rebecca Harms, commissioned a report on Chernobyl in 2006 (TORCH, The Other Report on Chernobyl). The 2006 TORCH report claimed that:

While the IAEA/WHO and UNSCEAR considered areas with exposure greater than 40,000 Bq/m2, the TORCH report also included areas contaminated with more than 4,000 Bq/m2 of Cs-137.

The TORCH 2006 report "estimated that more than half the iodine-131 from Chernobyl [which increases the risk of thyroid cancer] was deposited outside the former Soviet Union. Possible increases in thyroid cancer have been reported in the Czech Republic and the UK, but more research is needed to evaluate thyroid cancer incidences in Western Europe". It predicted about 30,000 to 60,000 excess cancer deaths, 7 to 15 Times greater than the figure of 4,000 in the IAEA press release; warned that predictions of excess cancer deaths strongly depend on the risk factor used; and predicted excess cases of thyroid cancer range between 18,000 and 66,000 in Belarus alone depending on the risk projection model. However, elevated incidence thyroid cancer is still seen among Ukrainians who were exposed to radioactivity due to Chernobyl accident during their childhood, but who were diagnosed the malignancy as adults.

Another study claims possible heightened mortality in Sweden.

Greenpeace quoted a 1998 WHO study, which counted 212 dead from only 72,000 liquidators. The environmental NGO estimated a total death toll of 93,000 but cite in their report that "The most recently published figures indicate that in Belarus, Russia and the Ukraine alone the disaster could have resulted in an estimated 200,000 additional deaths in the period between 1990 and 2004." In its report, Greenpeace suggested there will be 270,000 cases of cancer alone attributable to Chernobyl fallout, and that 93,000 of these will probably be fatal compare with the IAEA 2005 report which claimed that "99% of thyroid cancers wouldn't be lethal".

According to the Union Chernobyl, the main organization of liquidators, 10% of the 600,000 liquidators are now dead, and 165,000 disabled.

According to an April 2006 report by the International Physicians for Prevention of Nuclear Warfare (IPPNW), entitled "Health Effects of Chernobyl - 20 years after the reactor catastrophe", more than 10,000 people are today affected by thyroid cancer and 50,000 cases are expected. In Europe, the IPPNW claims that 10,000 deformities have been observed in newborns because of Chernobyl's radioactive discharge, with 5,000 deaths among newborn children. They also state that several hundreds of thousands of the people who worked on the site after the disaster are now sick because of radiation, and tens of thousands are dead.

Revisiting the issue for the 25th anniversary of the Chernobyl disaster, the Union of Concerned Scientists described the Forum's estimate of four thousand as pertaining only to "a much smaller subgroup of people who experienced the greatest exposure to released radiation". Their estimates for the broader population are 50,000 excess cancer cases resulting in 25,000 excess cancer deaths.

Human health effects Studies 
The majority of premature deaths caused by Chernobyl are expected to be the result of cancers and other diseases induced by radiation in the decades after the event.  This will be the result of a large population (some studies have considered the entire population of Europe) exposed to relatively low doses of radiation increasing the risk of cancer across that population.  Interpretations of the current health state of exposed populations vary. Therefore, estimates of the ultimate human impact of the disaster have relied on numerical models of the effects of radiation on health. Furthermore, the effects of low-level radiation on human health are not well understood, and so the models used, notably the linear no threshold model, are open to question.

Given these factors, studies of Chernobyl's health effects have come up with different conclusions and are sometimes the subject of scientific and political controversy. The following section presents some of the major studies on this topic.

Official studies

Chernobyl Forum report 
In September 2005, a draft summary report by the Chernobyl Forum, comprising a number of UN agencies including the International Atomic Energy Agency (IAEA), the World Health Organization (WHO), the United Nations Development Programme (UNDP), other UN bodies and the Governments of Belarus, the Russian Federation and Ukraine, set the number of deaths due to the accident at about 50 (47 workers who died of acute radiation syndrome and 9 children who died from thyroid cancer), and added that a "total of up to 4000 people could eventually die of radiation exposure from the Chernobyl nuclear power plant accident" (excess cancer deaths which might eventually happen among the 600,000 with the highest levels of exposure.).

The full version of the WHO health effects report adopted by the UN, published in April 2006, included an added 5000 eventually possible fatalities from contaminated areas in Belarus, Russia and Ukraine and predicted that, in total, an upper limit of 9000 might eventually die from cancer among the 6.9 million most-exposed Soviet citizens.  Some newspapers and antinuclear organizations claimed the paper was minimizing the consequences of the accident.

2008 UNSCEAR report 
The United Nations Scientific Committee on the Effects of Atomic Radiation (UNSCEAR) produced a detailed report on the effects of Chernobyl for the General Assembly of the UN in 2011. This report concluded that 134 staff and emergency workers developed acute radiation syndrome and of those 28 died of radiation exposure within three months. Many of the survivors developed skin conditions and radiation induced cataracts, and 19 had since died, but from conditions not necessarily associated with radiation exposure. Of the several hundred thousand liquidators, apart from some emerging indications of increased leukaemia, there was no other evidence of health effects.

In the general public in the affected areas, the only effect with 'persuasive evidence' was the fraction of the 6,000 cases of thyroid cancer in adolescents of whom by 2005 15 cases had proved fatal. There was no evidence of increased rates of solid cancers or leukaemia among the general population. However, there was psychological worry about the effects of radiation.

The total deaths reliably attributable by UNSCEAR to the radiation produced by the accident therefore was 62.

The report concluded that 'the vast majority of the population need not live in fear of serious health consequences from the Chernobyl accident'.

Unofficial studies

TORCH report 

In 2006 German Green Party Member of the European Parliament Rebecca Harms commissioned UK scientists Ian Fairlie and David Sumner for an alternate report (TORCH, The Other Report on CHernobyl) in response to the UN report. The report included areas not covered by the Chernobyl forum report, and also lower radiation doses. It predicted about 30,000 to 60,000 excess cancer deaths and warned that predictions of excess cancer deaths strongly depend on the risk factor used, and urged more research stating that large uncertainties made it difficult to properly assess the full scale of the disaster.

In 2016, an updated TORCH report was written by Ian Fairlie with support of Friends of the Earth Austria.

Greenpeace 

Greenpeace claimed contradictions in the Chernobyl Forum reports, quoting a 1998 WHO study referenced in the 2005 report, which projected 212 dead from 72,000 liquidators. In its report, Greenpeace suggested there will be 270,000 cases of cancer attributable to Chernobyl fallout, and that 93,000 of these will probably be fatal, but state in their report that "The most recently published figures indicate that in Belarus, Russia and Ukraine alone the accident could have resulted in an estimated 200,000 additional deaths in the period between 1990 and 2004." Blake Lee-Harwood, campaigns director at Greenpeace, believes that cancer was likely to be the cause of less than half of the final fatalities and that "intestinal problems, heart and circulation problems, respiratory problems, endocrine problems, and particularly effects on the immune system," will also cause fatalities. However, concern has been expressed about the methods used in compiling the Greenpeace report. It is not peer reviewed nor does it rely on peer review science as the Chernobyl Forum report did.

April 2006 IPPNW report 
According to an April 2006 report by the German affiliate of the International Physicians for Prevention of Nuclear Warfare (IPPNW), entitled "Health Effects of Chernobyl", more than 10,000 people are today affected by thyroid cancer and 50,000 cases are expected. The report projected tens of thousands dead among the liquidators. In Europe, it alleges that 10,000 deformities have been observed in newborns because of Chernobyl's radioactive discharge, with 5000 deaths among newborn children. They also claimed that several hundreds of thousands of the people who worked on the site after the accident are now sick because of radiation, and tens of thousands are dead.

Yablokov/Nesterenko publication
Chernobyl: Consequences of the Catastrophe for People and the Environment is an English translation of the 2007 Russian publication Chernobyl by Alexey Yablokov, Vassily Nesterenko and Alexey Nesterenko. It was published online in 2009 by the New York Academy of Sciences in their Annals of the New York Academy of Sciences. The New York Academy of Sciences included a disclaimer to inform readers it did not commission, endorse or peer review the work.

"In no sense did Annals of the New York Academy of Sciences or the New York Academy of Sciences commission this work; nor by its publication does the Academy validate the claims made in the original Slavic language publications cited in the translated papers. Importantly, the translated volume has not been formally peer‐reviewed by the New York Academy of Sciences or by anyone else."

The report presents an analysis of scientific literature and concludes that medical records between 1986, the year of the accident, and 2004 reflect 985,000 deaths as a result of the radioactivity released. The authors suggest that most of the deaths were in Russia, Belarus and Ukraine, but others were spread through the many other countries the radiation from Chernobyl struck. The literature analysis draws on over 1,000 published titles and over 5,000 internet and printed publications discussing the consequences of the Chernobyl disaster. The authors contend that those publications and papers were written by Eastern European authorities and have been downplayed or ignored by the IAEA and UNSCEAR. Author Alexy V. Yablokov was also one of the general editors on the Greenpeace commissioned report also criticizing the Chernobyl Forum findings published one year prior to the Russian-language version of this report.

A critical review by Dr. Monty Charles in the journal Radiation Protection Dosimetry states that Consequences is a direct extension of the 2005 Greenpeace report, updated with data of unknown quality. The New York Academy of Sciences also published a severely critical review by M. I. Balonov from the Institute of Radiation Hygiene (St. Petersburg, Russia) which stated that "The value of [Consequences] is not zero, but negative, as its bias is obvious only to specialists, while inexperienced readers may well be put into deep error."  Several other critical responses have also been published.

In 2016, 187 local Ukrainians had returned and were living permanently in the zone.

Higher than statistically normal appearances of defects
The American Academy of Pediatrics published a study state that the overall rate of neural tube defects in the Rivne region of Ukraine is one of the highest in Europe (22 per 10,000 live births). The rate in Polissia (Ukraine) is 27.0 per 10,000. The study suggested that rates of microcephaly and microphthalmia may also be higher than normal.

Other studies and claims 
The claim is made, by Collette Thomas, writing on 24 April 2006, that someone in the Ukrainian Health Ministry claimed in 2006 that more than 2.4 million Ukrainians, including 428,000 children, have health problems related to the catastrophe. The claim appears to have been invented by her through interpretation of a webpage of the Kyiv Regional Administration. Psychological after-effects, as the 2006 UN report pointed out, have also had adverse effects on internally displaced persons.
In a recently published study scientists from Forschungszentrum Jülich, Germany, published the "Korma-Report" with data of radiological long-term measurements that were performed between 1998 and 2007 in a region in Belarus that was affected by the Chernobyl accident. The internal radiation exposure of the inhabitants in a village in Korma County/Belarus caused by the existing radioactive contamination has experienced a decrease from a very high level. The external exposure, however, reveals a different picture. Although an overall decrease was observed, the organic constituents of the soil show an increase in contamination, not observed in soils from cultivated land or gardens. According to the Korma Report the internal dose will decrease to less than 0.2 mSv/a in 2011 and to below 0.1 mSv/a in 2020. Despite this, the cumulative dose will remain higher than "normal" due to external exposure. Resettlement may even be possible in former prohibited areas provided that people comply with appropriate dietary rules.
Study of heightened mortality in Sweden. But it must be pointed out that this study, and in particular the conclusions drawn has been very criticized.
 One study reports increased levels of birth defects in Germany and Finland in the wake of the accident.
 A change in the human sex ratio at birth from 1987 onward in several European countries has been linked to Chernobyl fallout.
 In the Czech Republic, thyroid cancer has increased significantly after Chernobyl.
The Abstract of the April 2006 International Agency for Research on Cancer report Estimates of the cancer burden in Europe from radioactive fallout from the Chernobyl accident stated "It is unlikely that the cancer burden from the largest radiological accident to date could be detected by monitoring national cancer statistics. Indeed, results of analyses of time trends in cancer incidence and mortality in Europe do not, at present, indicate any increase in cancer rates – other than of thyroid cancer in the most contaminated regions – that can be clearly attributed to radiation from the Chernobyl accident." They estimate, based on the linear no threshold model of cancer effects, that 16,000 excess cancer deaths could be expected from the effects of the Chernobyl accident up to 2065. Their estimates have very wide 95% confidence intervals from 6,700 deaths to 38,000.
The application of the linear no threshold model to predict deaths from low levels of exposure to radiation was disputed in a BBC (British Broadcasting Corporation) Horizon documentary, broadcast on 13 July 2006. It offered statistical evidence to suggest that there is an exposure threshold of about 200 millisieverts, below which there is no increase in radiation-induced disease. Indeed, it went further, reporting research from Professor Ron Chesser of Texas Tech University, which suggests that low exposures to radiation can have a protective effect. The program interviewed scientists who believe that the increase in thyroid cancer in the immediate area of the explosion had been over-recorded, and predicted that the estimates for widespread deaths in the long term would be proved wrong. It noted the view of the World Health Organization scientist Dr Mike Rapacholi that, while most cancers can take decades to manifest, leukemia manifests within a decade or so: none of the previously expected peak of leukemia deaths has been found, and none is now expected. Identifying the need to balance the "fear response" in the public's reaction to radiation, the program quoted Dr Peter Boyle, director of the IARC: "Tobacco smoking will cause several thousand times more cancers in the [European] population."
 An article in Der Spiegel in April 2016 also cast doubt on the use of the linear no threshold model to predict cancer rates from Chernobyl. The article claimed that the threshold for radiation damage was over 100 millisieverts and reported initial results of large-scale trials in Germany by the GSI Helmholtz Centre for Heavy Ion Research and three other German institutes in 2016 showing beneficial results of decreasing inflammation and strengthening bones from lower radiation doses.
 Professor Wade Allison of Oxford University (a lecturer in medical physics and particle physics) gave a talk on ionising radiation 24 November 2006 in which he gave an approximate figure of 81 cancer deaths from Chernobyl (excluding 28 cases from acute radiation exposure and the thyroid cancer deaths which he regards as "avoidable"). In a closely reasoned argument using statistics from therapeutic radiation, exposure to elevated natural radiation (the presence of radon gas in homes) and the diseases of Hiroshima and Nagasaki survivors he demonstrated that the linear no-threshold model should not be applied to low-level exposure in humans, as it ignores the well-known natural repair mechanisms of the body.

A photographic essay by photojournalist Paul Fusco documents problems in the children in the Chernobyl region. No evidence is offered to suggest these problems are in any way related to the nuclear incident
The work of photojournalist Michael Forster Rothbart documents the human impact of the disaster on residents who stayed in the affected area.
Bandashevsky measured levels of radioisotopes in children who had died in the Minsk area that had received Chernobyl fallout, and the cardiac findings were the same as those seen in test animals that had been administered Cs-137.

French legal action 
Since March 2001, 400 lawsuits have been filed in France against "X" (the French equivalent of John Doe, an unknown person or company) by the French Association of Thyroid-affected People, including 200 in April 2006. These persons are affected by thyroid cancer or goitres, and have filed lawsuits alleging that the French government, at the time led by Prime Minister Jacques Chirac, had not adequately informed the population of the risks linked to the Chernobyl radioactive fallout. The complaint contrasts the health protection measures put in place in nearby countries (warning against consumption of green vegetables or milk by children and pregnant women) with the relatively high contamination suffered by the east of France and Corsica. Although the 2006 study by the French Institute of Radioprotection and Nuclear Safety said that no clear link could be found between Chernobyl and the increase of thyroid cancers in France, it also stated that papillary thyroid cancer had tripled in the following years.

International response 

After the Chernobyl Disaster, a number of countries were reluctant to expand their nuclear programs. Italy and Switzerland tried to ban nuclear power all together. Other countries, such as the Netherlands and Finland postponed the addition of nuclear power plants. The disaster reaffirmed policy made by Austria and Sweden to terminate use of all nuclear energy. Germany set up regulatory organizations and new policy including the Federal Ministry of Environment and Reactor Safety and a new act for precaution protection against nuclear radiation.

Policy levers were not only implemented on a national level, but on an international level as well. In June 1986, the European Community implemented new standards for cesium. They attempted to do the same for iodine, but could not reach an agreement. Additionally several international programs were formed, including the World Association of Nuclear Operators. This association essentially linked 130 operators in 30 countries. Nuclear engineers would visit nuclear plants worldwide to learn and work towards better safety precautions.

The International Atomic Energy Agency (IAEA), established in 1957, created the Nuclear Safety Assistance Coordination Centre, which serves as an example of the international, multilateral cooperation resulting from the disaster (World Nuclear, 2016). They created the Convention on Early Notification of a Nuclear Accident and Convention on Assistance in the Case of a Nuclear Accident or Radiological Emergency. Nations called for a more comprehensive set of obligatory regulations for nuclear power plants from safe management of installation to safe management of radioactive waste. They also created the Joint Convention of Safety of Spent Fuel Management in which obliged nations to create proper policy to control nuclear power plant management.

See also

References

External links
Animated map of radioactive cloud, French IRSN (official Institut de Radioprotection et de Sûreté Nucléaire — Institute of Radioprotection and Nuclear Safety) 
Chernobyl animals worse affected than thought: study
 25 years of satellite imagery over Chernobyl

Radiation health effects
 
Environment of Ukraine
Health in the Soviet Union
Environment of the Soviet Union